These are the main career statistics of Romanian former professional tennis player Ilie Năstase, whose playing career lasted from 1969 through 1985.

Grand Slam finals

Singles: 5 (2 titles, 3 runner-ups)

Doubles: 5 (3 titles, 2 runner-ups)

Mixed doubles: 3 (2 titles, 1 runner-up)

Grand Prix year-end championships finals

Singles: 5 (4 titles, 1 runner-up)

Grand Prix Super Series finals

Singles: 9 (7 titles, 2 runner-ups)

Note: before the ATP took over running the men's professional tour in 1990 the Grand Prix Tour had a series of events that were precursors to the Masters Series known as the Grand Prix Tennis Super Series.

ATP Career finals

Singles: 104 (64 titles, 40 runner-ups)

 Sources

 Michel Sutter, Vainqueurs Winners 1946–2003, Paris, 2003. Sutter has attempted to list all tournaments meeting his criteria for selection beginning with 1946 and ending in the fall of 1991. For each tournament, he has indicated the city, the date of the final, the winner, the runner-up, and the score of the final. A tournament is included in his list if: (1) the draw for the tournament included at least eight players (with a few exceptions, such as the Pepsi Grand Slam tournaments in the second half of the 1970s); and (2) the level of the tournaments was at least equal to the present day challenger tournaments. Later, Sutter issued a second edition of his book, with only the players, their wins, and years from 1946 to 27 April 2003, period.
 John Barrett, editor, World of Tennis Yearbooks, London, from 1976 to 1983.
 Joe McCauley in Mr Nastase: The Autobiography, by Ilie Năstase with Debbie Beckerman, 2004.
 1982 WCT Yearbook
ATP Official Guide to Professional Tennis 2004 (page G18).

Doubles (45 titles )

Singles performance timeline

Qualifying matches and walkovers are neither official match wins nor losses.

 * including 57 pre-ATP and ATP titles
 ** including 749 – 287 (overall – 1036) listed by the ATP

Other titles (24)
Here are Năstase's tournament wins that are not included in the statistics on the Association of Tennis Professionals (ATP) website. The website is incomplete from 1968 to 1970 and has some omissions for tournaments held since 1968.

Năstase won several tournaments during the early years of his career that were equivalent to the present day "challenger" tournaments. Because the term "challenger" started to be applied to second-rank tournaments in 1978, those tournaments are termed "minor tournaments" in the following list.

 1967 – Cannes (minor tournament), Travemünde (minor tournament)
 1968 – Viareggio, Bucharest (minor tournament)
 1969 – Madras (minor tournament), New Delhi (minor tournament), Gauhati (minor tournament), Travemünde, La Corogne, Budapest, Denver
 1970 – Napoli, Ancona
 1971 – Istanbul
 1973 –  Istanbul
 1974 – Portland
 1975 – Helsinki, Dutch Round Robin (Utrecht Netherlands), Graz, Uppsala
 1976 – Caracas (a four-man invitation tournament in October, not to be confused with the Caracas WCT in March that was won by Raúl Ramírez), Argentine Round Robin (invitational tournament)
 1977 – Rotterdam World Star (invitational tournament)
 1978 – Frankfurt (invitational tournament)

Records
 These records were attained in the Open Era of tennis.

References

Năstase